Abdulmajeed Al-Zahrani (born 1 July 1999) is a Saudi Arabian professional footballer who plays as a midfielder for Al-Ain.

Career
Al-Zahrani started his career at the youth team of Al-Ittihad and represented the club at every level, he was chosen in the Saudi program to develop football talents established by General Sports Authority in Saudi Arabia. On 29 January 2021, Al-Zahrani joined Ohod on loan until the end of the season. On 18 July 2021, he joined Jeddah on loan. The loan was cut short and on 31 January 2022 Al-Zahrani joined Al-Okhdood on loan. On 21 August 2022, Al-Zahrani joined Al-Ain on a permanent deal.

References

External links
 

1999 births
Living people
Saudi Arabian footballers
Association football midfielders
Ittihad FC players
Ohod Club players
Jeddah Club players
Al-Okhdood Club players
Al-Ain FC (Saudi Arabia) players
Saudi Professional League players
Saudi First Division League players